The Seidelmann 34 is an American sailboat that was designed by Bob Seidelmann as a cruiser and first built in 1981.

Production
The design was built by Seidelmann Yachts in the United States, starting in 1981, but it is now out of production.

Design
The Seidelmann 34 is a recreational keelboat, built predominantly of fiberglass, with wood trim. It has a masthead sloop rig, a raked stem, a reverse transom, an internally mounted spade-type rudder controlled by a wheel and a fixed fin keel or optional shoal draft keel. It displaces  and carries  of ballast.

The design has sleeping accommodation for five people, with a double "V"-berth in the bow cabin, a straight settee in the main cabin and an aft cabin with a quarter berth on the port side. The galley is located on the starboard side just forward of the companionway ladder. The galley is equipped with a two-burner stove and a double sink. The head is located just aft of the bow cabin on the port side.

See also
List of sailing boat types

References

Keelboats
1980s sailboat type designs
Sailing yachts
Sailboat type designs by Bob Seidelmann
Sailboat types built by Seidelmann Yachts